Saat Phero Ki Hera Pherie is an Indian Hindi sitcom having been premiered on SAB TV on 27 February 2018. It was produced by Playtime Creationn. The story revolves around the lives of five neighborhood friends, two couples, and one bachelor boy.

Plot
The story is based on Mr. Bhoopi & Mrs. Neeta Tandon, the couple of 80s, Mr. Parimal &  Mrs. Rupal Desai, the couple of 90s, and Goldie Sharma, the modern bachelor. They are neighbours living in a housing society in Mumbai. All three men are unhappy with their lives. Sometimes, Goldie Sharma, is the cause for Tandon and Desai's couple fights. At times, both partners cause trouble for the other. However, each of them overcome the problems using the support of their neighbours and friends. Bhupi and Neetu have a daughter named Chinki but Parimal and Rupal are childless .

Cast and characters

Main
The following actors portray the main characters.
 Shekhar Suman as Bhupi Tandon: Neetu's husband, Chinki's father and a successful travel agent. He has old-fashioned beliefs and is always described as a typical but strong-willed man.
 Swati Shah as Neetu Tandon: Bhupi's wife, Chinki's mother and an obedient and innocent housewife believing in women's duties as a priority. She occasionally says the  catchphrase 'Ek Aurat Hone Ke Naatey' (being a woman). She ardently follows Baba Sevanand.
Ami Trivedi as Rupal Desai (aka 'Chakuri' a nickname given by her husband).  Parimal's wife and the daughter of a rich family.  Rupal has a privileged and granted lifestyle. She is a horrible cook and gets easily irritated especially with the mistakes of her husband, Parimal, who ends up kicked out of the house. The house was bought by the help of her parents' money (a constant annoyance for her husband).
 Amit Mistry as Parimal Desai: Rupal's husband and an unsuccessful man. He is an advisor in share market. Parimal has always been dominated and afraid by her wife, Rupal, whom he married to when they fell in love in their college days.
Kavin Dave as Goldie Sharma: An unemployed and obese bachelor. Being extremely irresponsible, Goldie ends up at the Tandon for food and other needs, He has strong alliances with  husbands, Bhupi and Parimal, however, occasionally tricks the two tried husbands. Such as instigating both of their wives, Neetu and Rupal, to extort money from the men's downfall and causing massive problems for them.

Recurring 
 Riya Sharma as Chinki: Bhupi and Neetu's daughter. She studies in the 8th standard and is addicted towards her phone.
Vijay Gokhale as Kulkarni Ji, Society's secretary cum president. His catchphrase is any noun with Less
Teetu Verma as Chotelal, Society's watchman. He doesn't work properly and sleeps most of time
 Kishore Bhanushali as Baba Sevanand, a Religious Sage ardently followed by Neetu Tandon. His sayings are shown on TV

Cameo appearances
 Vindhya Tiwari as Sweety, Parimal's College Friend
 Urfi Javed as Kajo (Kamini Joshi), Goldie's Love Interest
 Pooja Singh as Laajo,  Neetu's Far-Reaching Relative.
 Saina Kapoor as Vibha, Goldie's Girlfriend
 Sohan Shetty as Sonu, Neetu's Neighbour

See also
 List of Hindi comedy shows

References

External links
 Saat Phero Ki Hera Pherie on Sony Liv

Hindi comedy shows
Hindi language television sitcoms
2018 Indian television series debuts
Indian comedy television series
Sony SAB original programming
Television shows set in Mumbai